The 2nd Moscow International Film Festival was held from 9 to 23 July 1961. The Grand Prix was shared between the Japanese film The Naked Island directed by Kaneto Shindo and the Soviet film Clear Skies directed by Grigori Chukhrai.

Jury
 Sergei Yutkevich (USSR - President of the Jury)
 Chinghiz Aitmatov (USSR)
 Zoltán Várkonyi (Hungary)
 Luchino Visconti (Italy)
 Sergei Gerasimov (USSR)
 Karel Zeman (Czechoslovakia)
 Mehboob Khan (India)
 Joshua Logan (USA)
 Leon Moussinac (France)
 Roger Manwell (Great Britain)
 Francisco Piña (Mexico)
 Walieddin Youssef Samih (Egypt)
 Jerzy Toeplitz (Poland)
 Huang Guang (China)
 Michael Tschesno-Hell (East Germany)
 Liviu Ciulei (Romania)
 Borislav Sharaliev (Bulgaria)

Films in competition
The following films were selected for the main competition:

Awards
 Grand Prix: 
 The Naked Island by Kaneto Shindo
 Clear Skies by Grigori Chukhrai
 Special Golden Prize: Everybody Go Home by Luigi Comencini
 Golden Prizes:
Professor Mamlock by Konrad Wolf
 We Were Young by Binka Zhelyazkova
 Silver Prizes:
 Alba Regia by Mihály Szemes
 Thirst by Mircea Drăgan
 The Haunted Castle by Kurt Hoffmann
 Director: Armand Gatti for Enclosure
 Actor: Peter Finch for The Trials of Oscar Wilde
 Actor: Bambang Hermanto for Warriors for Freedom
 Actress: Yu Lan for A Revolutionary Family
 Director of photography: Boguslaw Lambach for Tonight a City Will Die
 Decorator Bill Constable and costume designer Terence Morgan for The Trials of Oscar Wilde

References

External links
Moscow International Film Festival: 1961 at Internet Movie Database

1961
1961 film festivals
1961 in the Soviet Union
Film